George Talbot may refer to:

George Talbot, 4th Earl of Shrewsbury (c. 1468–1538)
George Talbot, 6th Earl of Shrewsbury (1528–1590), English statesman
George Talbot, 9th Earl of Shrewsbury (1566–1630), Roman Catholic priest
Sir George Talbot, 3rd Baronet (1761–1850), English cricketer
George F. Talbot (1819–1907), Maine attorney and Solicitor of the United States Treasury
George Frederick Talbot (1859–1938), Justice of the Supreme Court of Nevada
George Talbot (judge) (1861–1938), Judge of the High Court of Justice
George Talbot (entomologist) (1882–1952), English entomologist who specialised in butterflies
George S. Talbot (1875–1918), English composer and writer
George Talbot (New Zealand cricketer) (1907–1943), New Zealand cricketer
George H. Talbot (1911–1996), American businessman